Palmerston North Central is the central suburb and central business district of Palmerston North, on New Zealand's North Island.

State Highway 3 passes through the area along Rangitikei Street, Main Street East, Grey Street and Princess Street.

The Square

The CBD is centred around 17 hectares of land, known as the Square. There are notable buildings and streets which surround this land, such as the old Post Office building (now a restaurant and nightspot) and the Square Building on the corner of Main Street East and the Square (which served as the old library to the city).

Surrounding The Square are several shops and restaurants, shopping centres, the Palmerston North Library, the Regent on Broadway, Arena Manawatu and the Rugby Museum, Te Manawa (formerly Manawatu Science Museum and Art Gallery), and the Centrepoint Theatre.

High-rise buildings in the city include the Spark telecommunications building on Main Street East, FMG House (Palmerston North's tallest building) and the former State Insurance building. Palmerston North City Council has its buildings on the corner of the Square and Main Street West, including by the large Civic Building. Palmerston North Police have moved from their old building on Church Street to a new complex across the road.

The All Saints Anglican Church dominates the south-west sector of the Square, characterised by its red brick construction. The Catholic Cathedral of the Holy Spirit on Broadway Avenue is located east of the square.

Demographics

There were 405 households. There were 579 males and 537 females, giving a sex ratio of 1.08 males per female. The median age was 27.7 years (compared with 37.4 years nationally), with 123 people (11.0%) aged under 15 years, 492 (44.1%) aged 15 to 29, 426 (38.2%) aged 30 to 64, and 75 (6.7%) aged 65 or older.

Ethnicities were 64.0% European/Pākehā, 19.4% Māori, 8.1% Pacific peoples, 19.1% Asian, and 3.2% other ethnicities (totals add to more than 100% since people could identify with multiple ethnicities).

The proportion of people born overseas was 28.0%, compared with 27.1% nationally.

Although some people objected to giving their religion, 46.5% had no religion, 33.6% were Christian, 3.2% were Hindu, 3.2% were Muslim, 1.9% were Buddhist and 5.9% had other religions.

Of those at least 15 years old, 168 (16.9%) people had a bachelor or higher degree, and 114 (11.5%) people had no formal qualifications. The median income was $18,900, compared with $31,800 nationally. The employment status of those at least 15 was that 408 (41.1%) people were employed full-time, 159 (16.0%) were part-time, and 120 (12.1%) were unemployed.

Economy

Retail

The Plaza shopping centre opened in 1986. It covers an area of 32,201 m², including 1,251 carparks and 103 shops. The mall's anchor tenants are Kmart, Farmers, Countdown and JB Hi-Fi.

Downtown Palmerston North also opened before the 1990s. It has 18 tenants, including Event Cinemas.

Education

The main Palmerston North campus of Universal College of Learning is located on the corner of King and Princess Streets. It has a red brick facade and  atrium. The brick building was formerly Palmerston North Technical High School (now Queen Elizabeth College, Rangitikei Street) and Palmerston North Teachers' College.

Mana Tamariki is a co-educational charter school for Year 1 to 13 students, located next to Aorangi Hospital.

References

Palmerston North
Suburbs of Palmerston North
Central business districts in New Zealand